The BRC Sprint is a Brisbane Racing Club Group 3 Thoroughbred open horse race run under Quality Handicap conditions over a distance of 1350 metres at Doomben Racecourse, Brisbane, Australia during the Queensland Winter Racing Carnival. The prizemoney is currently A$250,000

History

Name
1985–1990 - BTC Sprint
1991–1995 - BATC Sprint
1996–2009 - BTC Sprint
2010 onwards - BRC Sprint

Grade
1985–1995 -  Listed Race
1996 onwards - Group 3

Distance
1985–2019 – 1350 metres
2020 – 1200 metres

Records
Two trainers have won this race twice:
Walter Doolan (1990, 1991)
John Morish (1999, 2000)

Two jockeys have won the race twice:
John Hutchings (1990, 1991)
Larry Cassidy  (1993, 1995)

The race record is held by Chief De Beers in 1998 in 1:17.50. Chief De Beers recorded all his twenty victories on the Doomben race track.

Winners

 2022 - Soxagon
 2021 - Emerald Kingdom
 2020 - Tambo's Mate
 2019 - Tyzone
 2018 - I'm A Rippa
 2017 - Jungle Edge
 2016 - Snippets Land
 2015 - Charlie Boy
 2014 - River Lad
 2013 - Belltone
 2012 - Tiger Tees
 2011 - Woorim
 2010 - Beaded
 2009 - Court Command
 2008 - Helideck
 2007 - Friday Creek
 2006 - Hard To Catch
 2005 - Ballet Society
 2004 - True Glo
 2003 - Emission
 2002 - Carael Boy
 2001 - Zarta
 2000 - Pleasure Giver
 1999 - Pleasure Giver
 1998 - Chief De Beers
 1997 - Poetic King
 1996 - Taos
 1995 - Cohort
 1994 - Simonstad
 1993 - Kenfair
 1992 - Barrosa Boy     
 1991 - Tiny's Finto
 1990 - Tiny's Finto
 1989 - Count Henri
 1988 - Lots Of Rule
 1987 - Catering King
 1986 - High Signal
 1985 - Final Affair

See also
 List of Australian Group races
 Group races

References

Horse races in Australia
Sport in Brisbane